Jo-El Sonnier (born Joel Sonnier; October 2, 1946) is an American singer-songwriter and accordionist who performs country music and Cajun music. Originally signed to Mercury Nashville Records, Sonnier charted several minor singles on the Billboard country charts in the late 1970s. By the late 1980s, he had signed to RCA Records, breaking through with the Top Ten hits "No More One More Time" and a cover of Richard Thompson's "Tear Stained Letter". Although his chart success waned at the beginning of the 1990s, he has continued recording music, releasing more than thirty albums primarily on independent labels.

Biography
Sonnier was born to French-speaking sharecroppers in Rayne, Louisiana, United States. At age three, he began to play his brother's accordion. By age six, Sonnier had performed on the radio; at age 11, he made his first recordings. He also released several independent singles and four albums as a teenager. By the 1970s, he was signed to Mercury Nashville Records, but without much success in the country music field.

Sonnier temporarily abandoned his pursuit of a country music career in favor of recording Cajun music on the independent Rounder Records label. Although his independent album did not produce much commercial success, it was nominated for a Grammy Award. After being signed as Merle Haggard's opening act, Sonnier later decided to return to country music; he was signed to RCA Records in the 1980s, where his biggest successes came in the singles "No More One More Time" and a cover of British singer Richard Thompson's "Tear Stained Letter", songs which landed in the Top 10 on the country charts.

In the 1990s, Sonnier moved to Capitol Records, but his solo career faltered soon afterwards. He continued to find success as a session musician, and briefly took up acting as well. In the late 1990s, he returned to Rounder Records to record Cajun music once more, occasionally collaborating with Michael Doucet of BeauSoleil. Sonnier also saw his second Grammy nomination, for the 1997 album Cajun Pride; a third soon followed with 2001's Cajun Blood being nominated for Best Traditional Folk Album.

In 2009, Sonnier was inducted into The Louisiana Music Hall of Fame.

Sonnier made a brief cameo appearance as a member of a dance band in the third episode of the first season of the HBO crime series True Detective, which is set in southern Louisiana.

On February 8, 2015, Sonnier won a Grammy Award for Best Regional Roots Music Album.

The Legacy
On December 10, 2013, The Legacy was released on Takau Records, and was the first traditional Cajun French album of his in over 13 years. Ten years of songwriting in the making, the 13-track album drew Sonnier his fifth Grammy nomination and won him his first, as the 2015 Regional Roots Music Album of the Year.

Discography

Albums

Singles

Guest singles

Music videos

References

External links
 Official website
 
 

1946 births
Living people
Ace Records (United States) artists
American country singer-songwriters
American accordionists
Cajun accordionists
Capitol Records artists
Grammy Award winners
Mercury Records artists
People from Rayne, Louisiana
RCA Records Nashville artists
Rounder Records artists
Singer-songwriters from Louisiana
21st-century accordionists
Country musicians from Louisiana